Sultan and the Rock Star (also known as The Hunter and the Rock Star) is a 1980 American made-for-television adventure drama film starring Timothy Hutton and based on the novel Sandy and the Rock Star by Walt Morey, with the major difference being the titular cat is a mountain lion and not a tiger. It was originally broadcast on NBC as an episode of Disney's Wonderful World on April 20, 1980.

Synopsis
Paul Winters (Timothy Hutton) is an overworked teenage rock star who escapes from his fans and obligations to hide out on "Sportsman's Island", where he befriends Sultan, a gentle 400-pound show biz Bengal tiger. When he discovers the friendly feline is scheduled to be hunted and killed by the island's cruel owner, George McKinzie, Paul scrambles to protect his newfound friend.

Cast
Timothy Hutton as Paul Winters
Sultan as himself
Ken Swofford as George McKinzie
Bruce Glover as Alec Frost
Ned Romero as Joe Ironwood
Richard Paul as Al Matthews
Pat Delaney as Mrs. Winters
Shug Fisher as Motel Owner
Brendan Dillon as Hicks
Elven Havard as First Officer
Wayne Winton as Jake
John Lawrence as The Fisherman

Song
"Deeper in Love" George Thomas Charouhas and Steven B. Furman

Filming
Sultan and the Rock Star was filmed on location in July 1979 at Morro Bay, San Luis Obispo County, California.

During pre-production, Timothy Hutton spent two weeks at Disney's Golden Oak Ranch in Canyon County, California learning how to act around Sultan; he admitted that he was scared out of his wits for the first few days of training because it wasn't easy to be natural, loose and funny while acting with a tiger.

Home media
The film was released on DVD under the title The Hunter and the Rock Star exclusively through the Disney Movie Club and DisneyStore.com on May 1, 2012. On May 2, 2013, it was restored back to its original title and made available for rent or purchase via the "DisneyMoviesOnDemand" channel on YouTube.

References

External links

1980 television films
1980 films
1980 American television episodes
1980s adventure drama films
American adventure drama films
Walt Disney anthology television series episodes
Films based on American novels
Films about tigers
Disney television films
Films produced by Ron W. Miller
1980s American films